Brimi is a surname. Notable people with the surname include:

Arne Brimi (born 1957), Norwegian chef and food writer
Hans W. Brimi (1917–1998), Norwegian fiddler and traditional folk music performer

Surnames of Norwegian origin